is a male Japanese voice actor from Kanagawa prefecture. He is affiliated with Atomic Monkey. He is a Tokyo Animation University graduate.

Filmography

Anime
2012
Shin Sekai Yori as Bakenezumi
Sword Art Online as Sylph Corps (ep 23)
2014
Lord Marksman and Vanadis as Knight (ep 7); Chamberlain (ep 8); Soldier (eps 11-12)
Magimoji Rurumo as Kōta Shibaki
Wolf Girl and Black Prince as Male Friend (ep 7); Class 2 Boy (ep 9)
2015
The Disappearance of Nagato Yuki-chan as Tennis club member A (ep 5)
The Seven Deadly Sins as Holy Knight C (ep 23)
Triage X as Yasuomi Hachisuka
2016
Haven't You Heard? I'm Sakamoto as Schoolboy (ep 8)
Kiss Him, Not Me as Student
OZMAFIA!! as Judie
2017
Anonymous Noise as Male Student
2019
The Rising of the Shield Hero as Kitamura Motoyasu
Afterlost as Kōta
Kochoki: Wakaki Nobunaga as Sassa Narimasa
2022
The Rising of the Shield Hero 2 as Kitamura Motoyasu

Video Game
2013
Ken ga Kimi as Shiguragi
OZMAFIA!! as Judie
2014
Sword Art Online: Hollow Fragment
Shoumetsu Toshi as Kouta
2016
Ichichimanji Jie Online as Benkei
2021
Guilty Gear Strive as Happy Chaos

TV commercials
Bandai Namco Games (Reading Company title)

Voice Drama
Mairunovich (Vomic) as Ikeda
Kono Oto Tomare! (Vomic)

Stage
Makai Tensei as Servant 2-Dan

Dubbing
West Side Story as Quique (Julius Rubio)

References

External links
Official profile
 

Living people
Japanese male video game actors
Japanese male voice actors
Male actors from Kanagawa Prefecture
Year of birth missing (living people)
21st-century Japanese male actors